Kashani Expressway is an expressway in eastern Tehran.

Expressways in Tehran
Odonyms referring to religion